Crawford "Chilling" Ashley (born Gary Crawford, 20 May 1964 in Leeds is an English professional super middle/light heavy/cruiser/heavyweight boxer of the 1980s, '90s and 2000s, who won the British Boxing Board of Control (BBBofC) Central Area light heavyweight title, BBBofC British light heavyweight title, European Boxing Union (EBU) light heavyweight title (twice), and Commonwealth light heavyweight title (twice), drew with Yawe Davis for the vacant European Boxing Union (EBU) light heavyweight title, and was a challenger for the European Boxing Union (EBU) light heavyweight title against Graciano Rocchigiani, World Boxing Association (WBA) World super middleweight title against Michael Nunn, World Boxing Association (WBA) World light heavyweight title against Virgil Hill, and World Boxing Union (WBU) cruiserweight title against Sebastiaan Rothmann, his professional fighting weight varied from , i.e. super middleweight to , i.e. heavyweight.

References

External links

Image - Crawford Ashley

1964 births
Cruiserweight boxers
English male boxers
Light-heavyweight boxers
Living people
Martial artists from Leeds
Super-middleweight boxers